Geoffrey Gates (c.1550 Bury St Edmunds, Suffolk - ?) was a Puritan MP for various Cornish constituencies. He represented St Mawes constituency, West Looe constituency and Camelford constituency. He was elected to St Mawes in the 1572 United Kingdom general election, to West Looe in 1584 and to Camelford in 1586.

Gates also wrote a treatise called The Defence of Militarie Profession.

References

1550 births
Year of death unknown
Politicians from Suffolk
English MPs 1572–1583
English MPs 1584–1585
English MPs 1586–1587
Members of the Parliament of England for West Looe
Members of the Parliament of England for St Mawes
Members of the Parliament of England for Camelford